The 2018–19 NZ Touring Cars Championship  (known for commercial reasons as the 2018–19 BNT V8s Championship) was the twentieth season of the series, and the fourth under the NZ Touring Cars name. The field consisted of two classes racing on the same grid. Class one featured both V8ST and NZV8 TLX cars. Class two consisted of older NZV8 TL cars. The series was won by Australian Jack Smith, with Justin Ashwell taking the Class Two championship.

Entrants

Race calendar and results
All rounds are to be held in New Zealand. The first round in Pukekohe Park Raceway will be held in support of the Supercars Championship. Rounds 3, 4 and 5 are to be held with the Toyota Racing Series.

Championship standings

References

External links

Touring Cars
Touring Cars
NZ Touring Cars Championship seasons